Sonia Dawn Boyce,  (born 1962) is a British Afro-Caribbean artist and educator, living and working in London. She is a Professor of Black Art and Design at University of the Arts London. Boyce's research interests explore art as a social practice and the critical and contextual debates that arise from this area of study. With an emphasis on collaborative work, Boyce has been working closely with other artists since 1990, often involving improvisation and spontaneous performative actions on the part of her collaborators. Boyce's work involves a variety of media, such as drawing, print, photography, video, and sound. Her art explores "the relationship between sound and memory, the dynamics of space, and incorporating the spectator". To date, Boyce has taught Fine Art studio practice for more than 30 years in several art colleges across the UK.

In March 2016, Boyce was elected to the Royal Academy of Arts in London, becoming the first black female Royal Academician. The Royal Academy was founded in 1768.

In February 2020, Boyce was selected by the British Council to represent Britain at the Venice Biennale 2022, the first black woman to do so. In April 2022, Boyce won the Venice Biennale's top Golden Lion prize with her work Feeling Her Way.

Early life and education
Born in Islington, London, in 1962, Boyce attended Eastlea Comprehensive School in Canning Town, East London, from 1973 to 1979. From 1979 to 1980, she completed a Foundation Course in Art & Design at East Ham College of Art and Technology, going on to earn a BA degree in Fine Art at Stourbridge College from 1980 to 1983 in the West Midlands.

Career 
Boyce works with a range of media including photography, installation and text. She gained prominence as part of the Black British cultural renaissance of the 1980s. Her work also references feminism. Roy Exley (2001) has written: "The effect of her work has been to re-orientate and re-negotiate the position of Black or Afro-Caribbean art within the cultural mainstream."

An early exhibition in which Boyce participated was in 1983 at the Africa Centre, London, entitled Five Black Women. Her early works were large chalk-and-pastel drawings depicting friends, family and childhood experiences. Drawing from her background she often included depictions of wallpaper patterns and bright colours associated with the Caribbean. Through this work, the artist examined her position as a Black woman in Britain and the historical events in which that experience was rooted. She also took part in the 1983 exhibition Black Women Time Now.

In 1989, Boyce was a part of a group of four female artists who created an exhibition called The Other Story, which was the first display of British African, Caribbean, and Asian Modernism.

In her later works, Boyce used diverse media including digital photography to produce composite images depicting contemporary Black life. Although her focus is seen to have shifted away from specific ethnic experiences, her themes continue to be the experiences of a Black woman living in a white society, and how religion, politics and sexual politics made up that experience.

Boyce was awarded an MBE in the Queen's Birthday Honours List 2007, for services to art. On 9 March 2016, Boyce was elected as a member of the Royal Academy.

In 2018, as part of a retrospective exhibition of her art at Manchester Art Gallery, Boyce was invited by the curators of the gallery to make new work in dialogue with the collection's 18th- and 19th-century galleries, for which Boyce invited performance artists to engage with these works in these galleries in "a non-binary way". As part of one of these events, the artists decided to temporarily remove J. W. Waterhouse's painting Hylas and the Nymphs from the gallery wall, prompting a wide discussion of issues of censorship and curatorial decision-making, interpretation and judgement, by gallery audiences and in the media.

Boyce has taught widely and uses workshops as part of her creative process, and her works can be seen in many national collections. Boyce's works are held in the collections of Tate Modern, Victoria & Albert Museum, the Government Art Collection, British Council and the Arts Council Collection at the Southbank Centre.

In 2018, she was the subject of the BBC Four documentary film Whoever Heard of a Black Artist? Britain's Hidden Art History, in which Brenda Emmanus followed Boyce as she travelled the UK, highlighting the history of Black artists and modernism. Boyce led a team in preparing an exhibition at Manchester Art Gallery that focused on artists of African and Asian descent who have played a part in shaping the history of British art.

Boyce was appointed an Officer of the Order of the British Empire (OBE) in the 2019 New Year Honours for services to art.

It was announced in February 2020 that Boyce had been selected as the first Black woman to represent the United Kingdom at the Venice Biennale; chosen by the British Council, she would produce a major solo exhibition. The British Council's director of visual arts, Emma Dexter, stated that Boyce's inclusive and powerful work would be a perfect selection for this significant time in UK history. Boyce first attended the Biennale in 2015, she was a part of curator Okwui Enwezor's "All the World's Features" exhibition. Her piece, Feeling Her Way, was awarded the Golden Lion at the 2022 exhibition.

Personal life 
Boyce's partner is curator David A. Bailey, with whom she has two daughters.

In February 2023, Boyce appeared on BBC Radio 4's Desert Island Discs.

Medium
In her early artistic years, Boyce used chalk and pastel to make drawings of her friends, family and herself. She graduated later to incorporate photography, graphic design, film, and caricature to convey very political messages within her work. The incorporation of collage allowed her to explore more complex pieces. It is important to note Boyce's utilization of caricature within her work. The caricature is historically meant to showcase exaggerated features of individuals. They are often grotesque and can incite negative perceptions of their subjects. By using caricatures, Boyce allows herself to reclaim them in her own image.

Message

Boyce's work is politically affiliated. She utilizes a variety of mediums within the same work to convey messages revolving around Black representation, perceptions of the black body and pervasive notions that arose from scientific racism. Within her bodies of work, Boyce works to convey the personal isolation that results from being black in a white society. In her work she explores notions of the Black Body as the "other". Commonly, she uses collage to convey a body of art that incites a complicated history. Boyce rose as a prominent artist in the 1980s when the Black Cultural Renaissance took place. The movement arose out of opposition to Margaret Thatcher's brand of conservatism and her cabinet's policies. Using this societal backdrop, Boyce takes conventional narratives surrounding the black body and turns it upside down. Through her art she conveys a hope to overturn ethnographic notions of race that pervaded throughout slavery and after the slaves had been emancipated.

Exhibitions

Solo 

 Conversations, The Black-Art Gallery, London (1986)
 Sonia Boyce, Air Gallery, London (1986)
 Sonia Boyce: recent work, Whitechapel Art Gallery, London (1988)
 Something Else, Vanessa Devereux Gallery, London (1991)
 Do You Want To Touch?, 181 Gallery, London (1993)
 Sonia Boyce: PEEP, Royal Pavilion Art Gallery, Brighton (1995)
 Recent Sonia Boyce: La, La, La, Reed College, Portland, Oregon (2001)
 Devotional, National Portrait Gallery, London (2007)
 For you, only you (ed. Paul Bonaventura, Ruskin School of Drawing & Fine Art, Oxford University, and tour, 2007/2008)
 Crop Over, Harewood House, Leeds, and Barbados Museum & Historical Society (2007/2008)
 Like Love – Part One, Spike Island, Bristol, and tour (2009–2010);[20] "Part 2 and Part 3" (2009–2010)
 Scat – Sound and Collaboration, Iniva, Rivington Place, London (2013)
 Paper Tiger Whisky Soap Theatre (Dada Nice), Villa Arson, Nice (2016)
 Manchester Art Gallery (2018)

Group 

 Five Black Women, Africa Centre, London (1983)
 Black Woman Time Now, Battersea Arts Centre, London (1983)
 Strip Language, Gimpel Fils, London (1984)
 Into The Open, Mappin Art Gallery, Sheffield (1984)
 Heroes And Heroines, The Black-Art Gallery, London (1984)
 Room At The Top, Nicola Jacobs Gallery, London (1985)
 Blackskins/Bluecoat, Bluecoat Gallery, Liverpool (1985)
 Celebrations/Demonstrations, St Matthews Meeting Place, London (1985)
 No More Little White Lies, Chapter Arts Centre, Cardiff (1985)
 Reflections, Riverside Studios, London (1985)
 The Thin Black Line, ICA, London (1985)
 From Generation To Generation, Black Art Gallery, London (1985)
 Some Of Us Are Brave – All Of Us Are Strong, Black Art Gallery London (1986)
 Unrecorded Truths, Elbow Room, London (1986)
 From Two Worlds, Whitechapel Art Gallery, London (1986)
 Caribbean Expressions In Britain, Leicestershire Museum and Art Gallery (1986)
 Basel Art Fair, Switzerland (1986)
 State Of The Art, ICA, London (1986)
 A Cabinet Of Drawings, Gimpel Fils, London (1986)
 The Image Employed – The Use Of Narrative In Black Art, Cornerhouse, Manchester (1987)
 Critical Realism, Nottingham Castle Museum and Art Gallery (1987)
 Basel Art Fair, Switzerland (1987)
 Royal Overseas League, London (1987)
 The Essential Black Art, Chisenhale Gallery, London (1988)
 The Impossible Self, Winnipeg Art Gallery, Winnipeg (1988)
 The Thatcher Years, Angela Flowers Gallery, London (1988)
 Fashioning Feminine Identities, University of Essex, Colchester (1988)
 Along The Lines of Resistance, Cooper Art Gallery, Barnsley (1988)
 The Wedding, Mappin Art Gallery, Sheffield (1989)
 The Other Story, Hayward Gallery, London (1989)
 The Cuban Biennale, Wifredo Lam Cultural Centre, Havana (1989)
 The British Art Show, McLellan Galleries, Glasgow (1990)
 Distinguishing Marks, University of London (1990)
 The Invisible City, Photographers Gallery, London (1990)
 Black Markets, Cornerhouse, Manchester (1990)
 Delfina Open Studios, London (1991)
 Shocks To The System, Southbank Centre, London (1991)
 Delfina Annual Summer Show, London (1991)
 An English Summer, Palazzo della Crepadona, Belluna, Italy (1991)
 Photo Video, Photographers' Gallery, London (1991)
 Delfina Annual Summer Show, London (1992)
 White Noise, IKON Gallery, Birmingham (1992)
 Northern Adventures, Camden Arts Centre and St Pancras Station, London (1992)
 Nosepaint Artist Club, London (1992)
 Innocence And Experience, Manchester City Art Galleries (1992)
 New England Purpose Built: Long Distance Information, Real Art Ways, Hartford, USA (1993)
 Thinking Aloud, Small Mansions Art Centre, London (1994)
 Wish You Were Here, BANK, London (1994)
 Glass Vitrine, INIVA Launch, London (1994)
 Free Stories, LA Galerie, Frankfurt (1995)
 Portable Fabric Shelters, London Printworks Trust, London (1995)
 Fetishism, Brighton Museum, Brighton (1995)
 Mirage, ICA, London (1995)
 Photogenetic, Street Level, Glasgow (1995)
 Cottage Industry, Beaconsfield, London (1995)
 Picturing Blackness in British Art, Tate, London (1996)
 Kiss This, Focalpoint Gallery, Southend (1996)
 Video Positive: the Other Side of Zero, Bluecoat Gallery, Liverpool (2000)
 New Woman Narratives, World-Wide Video Festival, Amsterdam (2000)
 Century City: Art and Culture in the Modern Metropolis, Tate Modern, London (2001)
 Sharjah International Biennial: 7, Sharjah (2005)
 Menschen und Orte, Kunstverein Konstanz, Konstanz (2008)
 Praxis: Art in Times of Uncertainty, Thessaloniki Biennal 2, Greece (2009)
 Afro Modern: Journeys through the Black Atlantic, Tate Liverpool and tour (2010)
 Walls Are Talking: Wallpaper, Art and Culture, Whitworth Art Gallery, Manchester (2010)
 Griot Girlz: Feminist Art and the Black Atlantic, Kunstlerhaus Büchenhausen, Innsbruck (2010)
 ¡Afuera! Art in Public Spaces, Centro Cultural España/Cordoba, Argentina (2010)
 8+8 Contemporary International Video Art, 53 Museum, Guangzhou (2011)
 The Impossible Community, Moscow Museum of Modern Art (2011)
 Coming Ashore, Berardo Collection Museum/P-28 Container Project, Lisbon (2011)
 Black Sound White Cube, Kunstquartier Bethanien, Berlin (2011)
 Migrations: Journeys into British Art, Tate Britain (2012)
 There is no archive in which nothing gets lost, Museum of Fine Arts, Houston (2012)
 Play! Re-capturing the Radical Imagination, Göteborg International Biennial of Contemporary Art 7 (2013)
 Keywords, Rivington Place, London (2013)
 Speaking in Tongues, CCA, Glasgow (2014)
 All the World's Futures, 56th Venice Biennale of Contemporary Art, Venice (2015)
 No Colour Bar: Black British Art in Action 1960–1990, Guildhall Art Gallery, London (2015–16)

Selected awards and recognition 

 2007: appointed a Member of the Most Excellent Order of the British Empire (MBE) in the Queen's Birthday Honours List, for services to art
 2016: elected to the Royal Academy of Arts
 2019: appointed an Officer of the Order of the British Empire (OBE) in the New Year Honours, for services to art
 2020: selected to represent the United Kingdom at the 59th Venice Biennale
 2022: awarded the Venice Biennale's Golden Lion for her piece Feeling Her Way

Research positions

 1996–2002: Post-Doctoral Fellow, University of East London
 1996–2002: Co-Director, AAVAA (the African and Asian Visual Artists Archive)
 2004–2005: Artist Fellow, NESTA 
 2008–2011: Research Fellow, Wimbledon College of Art and Design, University of the Arts London. AHRC funded research project on the ephemeral nature of collaborative practice in art, concluding in the project The Future is Social.
 2015–2018: Principal Investigator, Black Artists and Modernism (BAM) a research project on work by Black British artists and modernism

Selected publications
Gilane Tawadros, Sonia Boyce: Speaking in Tongues, London: Kala Press, 1997.
 Annotations 2/Sonia Boyce: Performance (ed. Mark Crinson, Iniva – the Institute of International Visual Arts, 1998)
In 2007, Boyce, David A. Bailey and Ian Baucom jointly received the History of British Art Book Prize (USA) for the edited volume Shades of Black: Assembling Black Art in 1980s Britain, published by Duke University Press in collaboration with Iniva and AAVAA.
 Allison Thompson, "Sonia Boyce and Crop Over", Small Axe, Volume 13, Number 2, 2009.
Like Love, Spike Island, Bristol, and tour (ed. Axel Lapp; Berlin: Green Box Press, 2010)
Boyce co-edited the summer 2021 issue of Art History on Black British Modernism with Dorothy Price.
John Roberts, "Interview with Sonia Boyce", Third Text, no. 1 (Autumn 1987), 55–64
Sonia Boyce, "Talking in Tongues", in Storms of the Heart, edited by Kwesi Owusu
Facsimile of letter by Sonia Boyce in Veronica Ryan's: Compartments/Apart-ments

References

Further reading
Sonia Boyce (exhibition catalogue, intro Pitika Ntuli; London, Air Gallery, 1987) [texts by Boyce]
The Impossible Self (exhibition catalogue by B. Ferguson, S. Nairne, S. Boyce and others, Winnipeg, A.G., 1988)
M. Corris: "Sonia Boyce at Vanessa Devereux Gallery", Artforum, xxx (1992), p. 124
Gilane Tawadros, Sonia Boyce: Speaking in Tongues. London: Kala Press, 1997. 
Recent Sonia Boyce: La, La, La (exhibition catalogue by S. Fillin-Yeh and M. Verhagen; Portland, OR, Reed Coll, Cooley A.G.; 2001)
David A. Bailey, Kobena Mercer, Catherine Ugwu (eds), MIRAGE: Enigmas of Race, Difference and Desire, ICA, 1995. .
M. Crinson (ed.): Sonia Boyce: Performance, Institute of International Visual Arts in collaboration with Cornerhouse (London, 1998)

External links
 
 John Elmes, "Interview with Sonia Boyce", Times Higher Education, 17 December 2015.
 InIVA on Sonia Boyce
 National Portrait Gallery
 Sue Hubbard, "Sonia Boyce at The Agency" (review), The Independent, 6 December 2004.
 "Sonia Boyce: 'Gathering a history of black women. Interview 27 July 2018, Tate.
 "Whoever Heard of a Black Artist - Britain's Hidden Art History"
 "Sonia Boyce RA". Profile on Royal Academy site

1962 births
Living people
20th-century English women artists
21st-century English women artists
Academics of Middlesex University
Academics of the University of the Arts London
Alumni of Stourbridge College
Artists from London
Black British artists
British contemporary artists
British installation artists
Feminist artists
Members of the Order of the British Empire
Officers of the Order of the British Empire
People from Islington (district)
Royal Academicians